Eddie Edwards may refer to:
Eddie Edwards (American football) (born 1954), American football player
Eddie Edwards (musician) (1899–1963), American jazz trombonist
Eddie Edwards (tennis) (born 1956), South African tennis player
"Eddie the Eagle" Edwards (born 1963), real name Michael Edwards, British ski jumper
Eddie Edwards (wrestler) (born 1983), American professional wrestler
Eddie Edwards (born 1968), American civil servant; see 2018 United States House of Representatives elections in New Hampshire#eddie_edwards

See also
Ed Edwards, advertising executive and filmmaker
Edward Edwards (disambiguation)
Edwin Edwards (disambiguation)
List of people with reduplicated names